Anderson Cléber Beraldo (born 27 April 1980), simply known as Anderson, is a retired Brazilian footballer who played as a centre back, and currently as a manager.

Club career

Early career
Anderson started playing professional football for Corinthians of São Paulo. He played on the team for five consecutive seasons, moving to Portugal in the middle of his sixth season.

Benfica and Lyon
In the summer of 2005 he was bought by S.L. Benfica of the Primeira Liga. He made his Benfica debut in the 2005 Supertaça Cândido de Oliveira against Vitória de Setúbal on 13 August. Anderson would play alongside Luisão and help his side claim their first Supertaça in sixteen years. He would make his league debut on 20 August against Académica de Coimbra at the Estádio Cidade de Coimbra in a goalless draw. He would score his first league goal for Benfica on 18 September in a league game at the Estádio da Luz in 4–0 victory over União de Leiria.

His first full season with Benfica saw him feature regularly in Benfica's starting eleven under the management of Ronald Koeman. He would play a pivotal role in Benfica's 2005–06 UEFA Champions League campaign where they reached the quarter-final stage where they would end up eliminated by FC Barcelona. Despite Benfica's successful UEFA Champions League campaign, their league campaign would prove to be a disappointing one as they would finish behind rivals Porto and Sporting CP. Anderson would end his first season with forty one appearances with four goals scored.

The 2006–07 season would see a change of manager for Benfica as Ronald Koeman would be replaced by Fernando Santos which changed the fortunes of Anderson's playing time. The arrival of Santos would see Anderson play less regularly. Under Fernando Santos, he would play nineteen league games in the entire season. Following the end of the season, he left Benfica for French side Lyon.

Anderson signed for French side Lyon in a €4 million deal in the summer of 2007. His three-year spell at Lyon would him featured very little. His time with Lyon would see him be loaned to Brazilian sides São Paulo and Cruzeiro. In late 2010, he terminated his contract with Lyon and returned to Brazil.

Return to Brazil
In early 2011 he returned to Brazil with Esporte Clube Santo André. His stay would be short as he would move clubs again in the same season to América Mineiro. His time with América Mineiro would see him be used primarily as a substitute. In 2012, he would leave América Mineiro for Campeonato Brasileiro Série B side Paraná in a quest to play more first team football.

International career
Anderson's first and only cap for the Brazilian national team came on 27 April 2005 against Guatemala as he was called up by then Brazilian manager Carlos Alberto Parreira. He scored one of Brazil's goals in their 3–0 victory.

International goals

Honours

Club
Corinthians
 Campeonato Brasileiro Série A: 2005
 Copa do Brasil: 2002
 Torneio Rio – São Paulo: 2002
 Campeonato Paulista: 2001, 2003

Benfica
 Supertaça Cândido de Oliveira: 2005

Lyon
 Ligue 1: 2007–08
 Coupe de France: 2008

São Paulo
 Campeonato Brasileiro Série A: 2008

Cruzeiro
 Campeonato Mineiro: 2009

International
Brazil
 Lunar New Year Cup: 2005

References

External links

1980 births
Footballers from São Paulo
Living people
Association football central defenders
Brazilian expatriate footballers
Expatriate footballers in Portugal
Expatriate footballers in France
Brazilian footballers
Brazilian football managers
Campeonato Brasileiro Série A players
Primeira Liga players
Ligue 1 players
Campeonato Brasileiro Série C managers
Sport Club Corinthians Paulista players
Brazil international footballers
S.L. Benfica footballers
Olympique Lyonnais players
São Paulo FC players
Cruzeiro Esporte Clube players
Esporte Clube Santo André players
América Futebol Clube (MG) players
Paraná Clube players
Associação Portuguesa de Desportos managers